Pattini, is considered a guardian deity of Sri Lanka in Sri Lankan Buddhism and Sinhalese folklore. She is also worshipped by Sri Lankan Tamil Hindus by the name of Kannaki Amman.

She is considered the patron goddess of fertility and health, particularly protection against smallpox, which is referred to as deviyange ledé ('the divine affliction') in the Sinhala language.

History
Goddess Pattini is the deification of Kannagi, who is the central character of the Tamil epic Silapadhikaram of Ilango Adigal, written in India after the 2nd Century CE. After a short time, it was introduced into Sri Lanka and absorbed earlier deities such as Kiri Amma ('milk mother'). Historians attribute the introduction of goddess Pattini to the island to Gajabahu I, a Sinhalese king who ruled Sri Lanka from 113 - 135 CE. As per some historians, the Silapathikaram mentions Gajabahu's presence at the consecration of a temple to Kannagi (identified as Pattini in this case) by the Chera king Senguttuvan.

Rituals
Pattini is honoured in annually fertility rites such as
Gammaduwa (village rebirth) festivals, during which her myth is enacted.
Ankeliya (horn games) in which, as in the British game of Uppies and Downies, upper and lower teams compete.
Porakeliya (fight games) during which two teams hurl coconuts at each other.

Nursing mothers' alms-giving

Sinhalese people believe that diseases like chickenpox and measles are punishments by God for frailty. In such events as the goddess of healing they pray to Pattini Devi. When a family member is infected, they hold Dānas (alms-givings) for her, called Kiri-ammāwarungè dānaya (Nursing mothers' alms-giving).

Pattini temples in Sri Lanka

See also
Kannaki Amman
Upulvan
Kannagi
Kataragama deviyo

References

Further reading

External links
Website of Kubulumulla Pattini Devalaya 
Nawagamuwa Pattini Devalaya

Sinhalese Buddhist deities
Goddesses